Fawzi Ouaamar (born 12 March 1993) is a Moroccan professional footballer who plays as a midfielder for Pau FC.

Club career
A youth product of Monaco, Ouaamar was loaned in July 2014 to Arles-Avignon to gain more playing time. He made his full professional debut a few weeks later, in a 0–0 Ligue 2 draw against Ajaccio.

Released by Monaco, Ouammar signed a three-year deal with Moroccan side Chabab Rif Al Hoceima in August 2016.

After one season in Morocco he returned to France, signing for three months with Le Pontet. In January 2018 he signed a two-and-a-half-year deal with GS Consolat, but left after six months due to personal reasons. He spent the 2018–19 season with sixth-tier amateur club UMS Montélimar, and in July 2019 signed a one-year deal with Pau, rejoining his former coach form Monaco and Arles-Avignon, Bruno Irles.

References

External links
 
 
 Fawzi Ouaamar foot-national.com Profile

1993 births
Living people
Association football midfielders
Moroccan footballers
Ligue 2 players
Championnat National players
Championnat National 2 players
Championnat National 3 players
Botola players
AC Arlésien players
US Pontet Grand Avignon 84 players
Chabab Rif Al Hoceima players
UMS Montélimar players
Athlético Marseille players
Pau FC players